The Presidential Palace is the residence of the President of Guinea-Bissau, situated in the capital city of Bissau. At its height it was one of the most substantial buildings in the city, but it was ruined during the 1998–99 Guinea-Bissau Civil War and subject to bombing. As of 2012 the palace still stood, but had become derelict, and infested with bats.

Renovation
The palace was renovated and reopened in 2013, funded with Chinese investment, as part of several large-scale building projects in the city, including a 20,000 seater stadium and new parliament house.

References

Presidential residences
Buildings and structures in Bissau
Government buildings completed in 2013